Sunil Bhaskaran is the head of newly created Air India Aviation Training Academy. He was the chief executive officer and managing director of AirAsia India and the former Vice President of corporate services at Tata Steel.

Early life and education
Bhaskaran did his BTech from IIT Delhi in 1985. He did his post-graduation in Management from IIM Kolkata in 1987.

Career
Bhaskaran started his career in 1987 as a management trainee at Tata Steel. After that, he became the Vice President of Corporate services at Tata Steel. He worked in Tata Steel for over 30 years. On 15 November 2018, he joined AirAsia India as the chief executive officer and managing director. He is also the Chairman of Jamshedpur Football Club and board at Jusco.

References

Living people
Place of birth missing (living people)
20th-century Indian businesspeople
IIT Delhi alumni
Indian businesspeople
Indian Institute of Management Calcutta alumni
Year of birth missing (living people)